Kyousougiga is an original net animation created by Izumi Todo and produced by Toei Animation in collaboration with Banpresto. The original ONA was released on YouTube and other sites on December 6, 2011. Five additional ONA episodes were streamed between August 31, 2012 and December 22, 2012. A 13-episode television series (including two summary and one special episode) began airing from October 2, 2013.

Episode list

ONA series

TV series
There are 10 main episodes and 3 extras (episodes 0, 5.5 and 10.5)

References

Kyousogiga